Cirrhaea dependens is a species of orchid endemic to Brazil. It is the type species for its genus.

References

dependens
Endemic orchids of Brazil
Plants described in 1825